Niels-Erik Andreasen (born 1941) was the president of Andrews University in Berrien Springs, Michigan, from 1994 to 2016.

Work
Born in Fredensborg, Denmark, Andreasen lived in Denmark for his first 19 years. He then studied at Newbold College, England, for three years and immigrated to the United States in 1963.

Andreasen graduated in 1963 with a bachelor's degree in religion and history from Newbold College, Bracknell, England. He holds two degrees from Andrews University: a master of arts in Biblical studies, which he received in 1965; and a bachelor of divinity degree, 1966. In 1971, he received a doctorate degree in religious studies from Vanderbilt University, Nashville, Tenn.

In 1970, Andreasen began what has been more than a quarter of a century of teaching and leadership posts for Seventh-day Adventist colleges and universities. From 1970 to 1977, he taught religion at Pacific Union College, Angwin, California. From 1977 to 1990, he served in various positions at Loma Linda University (Riverside and Loma Linda, California, campuses).  His most recent position at that institution was dean of the Loma Linda University School of Religion. In addition, he was a visiting lecturer in Australia, England, El Salvador, Costa Rica, Hong Kong, Puerto Rico, France, Germany, and New Zealand.

In 1990, Andreasen was named president of Walla Walla College (now Walla Walla University), College Place, Washington. He served in that capacity until July 1994, when he became the fifth president of Andrews University.

Andreasen is the author of three books, including "The Christian Use of Time" and "The Old Testament Sabbath," as well as various articles and reviews.

He has served on several hospital boards and Seventh-day Adventist executive committees, including executive committees of the Upper Columbia, North Pacific Union and Lake Union conferences.

He is a member of the Society of Biblical Literature.

Works
The Old Testament Sabbath a Tradition: Historical Investigation. Missoula, MT: Society of Biblical Literature 1972.
The Christian Use of Time. Nashville, TN: Abingdon 1978.
Rest and Redemption: A Study of the Biblical Sabbath. Andrews University Monographs - Studies in Religion 11. Berrien Springs, MI: Andrews UP 1978.

References

External links
"Andreasen Eyes Cautious Growth for Andrews University", ELIZABETH LECHLEITNER
"Church Chat: Andreasen on leading an Adventist university in the 21st century", 6 Jan 2009

See also 

 Seventh-day Adventist Church
 Seventh-day Adventist theology
 Seventh-day Adventist eschatology
 History of the Seventh-day Adventist Church
 28 fundamental beliefs
 Teachings of Ellen White#End times
 Inspiration of Ellen White
 Prophecy in the Seventh-day Adventist Church
 Investigative judgment
 The Pillars of Adventism
 Second Advent
 Baptism by Immersion
 Conditional Immortality
 Historicism
 Three Angels' Messages
 End times
 Sabbath in Seventh-day Adventism
 Inspiration of Ellen White
 Ellen G. White
 Adventist Review
 Adventist
 Seventh-day Adventist Church Pioneers
 Seventh-day Adventist worship
 Seventh-day Adventist Church
 Seventh-day Adventist theology
 Seventh-day Adventist eschatology
 History of the Seventh-day Adventist Church

Pacific Union College faculty
Seventh-day Adventist religious workers
Seventh-day Adventist theologians
Living people
1941 births
Danish Protestant theologians
Danish Seventh-day Adventists
Andrews University faculty
Loma Linda University faculty
Walla Walla University
20th-century Protestant theologians
People from Fredensborg Municipality